He'll Have to Go is a compilation album recorded by Jim Reeves and released in 1960 on the RCA Victor label (catalog no. LPM-2223). The album included two No. 1 hits: "He'll Have to Go" and "Billy Bayou". 

Unlike other Jim Reeves albums, this was a compilation of previously issued non-LP singles and EP tracks. In 1962, RCA reissued this album in "electronic stereo" (RCA LSP-2223 (e)). All twelve songs, including the title track, were presented in "electronic stereo" even though  "He'll Have To Go" was issued in true stereo on a 1960 single (RCA 61-7643, 1960), and true stereo masters existed for five other songs.

In Billboard magazine's annual poll of country and western disc jockeys, it was ranked No. 4 among the "Favorite C&W Albums" of 1960.

Track listing
Side A
 "He'll Have to Go" [2:16]
 "I Love You More" [2:22]
 "Wishful Thinking" [1:59]
 "Honey, Won't You Please Come Home" [1:59]
 "I'm Beginning To Forget You" [2:09]
 "Billy Bayou" [2:02]

Side B
 "If Heartache Is The Fashion" [2:23]
 "Partners" [2:13]
 "Theme Of Love" [2:04]
 "I'd Like To Be" [2:00]
 "After Awhile" [2:08]
 "Home" [1:58]

See also
 Jim Reeves discography

References

1960 albums
Jim Reeves albums